Human Powered Health is a women's professional cycling team founded in 2012 which currently competes in the UCI Women's World Tour. In 2022, Human Powered Health became the first co-educational professional cycling team to promote its women's team to the WorldTour level ahead of its men's program. 

The team was founded as Optum-Kelly Benefit Strategies and was initially directed by Rachel Heal. The team's current sports directors are Joanne Kiesanowski and Andrew Bajadali.

Team roster

Major wins

2012
Stage 4 Tour Cycliste Féminin International de l'Ardèche, Joëlle Numainville
2013
Stages 3 & 4 Tour Cycliste Féminin International de l'Ardèche, Joëlle Numainville
2014
Gent–Wevelgem, Lauren Hall
Sprints classification Redlands Bicycle Classic, Leah Kirchmann
Stages 3 & 4, Leah Kirchmann
Teams classification The Women's Tour
Grand Prix cycliste de Gatineau, Denise Ramsden
Young rider classification North Star Grand Prix, Leah Kirchmann
Teams classification
Tour de Delta MK Criterium, Denise Ramsden
Tour de Delta Brenco Criterium, Leah Kirchmann
White Spot / Delta Road Race, Leah Kirchmann
Gastown Grand Prix, (NCC), Leah Kirchmann
 Overall Tour de Feminin-O cenu Českého Švýcarska, Brianna Walle
 Sprints classification, Brianna Walle
Stage 5, Brianna Walle
2015
Stage 2 San Dimas Stage Race, Lex Albrecht
Stage 3 San Dimas Stage Race, Brianna Walle
Stage 2 Joe Martin Stage Race p/b Nature Valley, Leah Kirchmann
Stage 2 Tour of the Gila, Annie Ewart
Stages 2 & 3 Tour of California, Leah Kirchmann
Stage 3 BeNe Ladies Tour, Alison Tetrick
Pan American Games Road Race, Jasmin Glaesser
2016
Stage 2 Tour of the Gila, Jasmin Glaesser
Stage 4 Tour of the Gila, Heather Fischer
2017
Stage 4 Tour of the Gila, Emma White
 Mountains classification Cascade Cycling Classic, Sara Poidevin
 Young rider classification, Sara Poidevin
Stages 1 & 5, Kirsti Lay
Stage 3, Sara Bergen
 Overall Colorado Classic, Sara Poidevin
 Points classification, Sara Poidevin
 Mountains classification, Sara Poidevin
 Young rider classification, Sara Poidevin
Stage 2, Sara Poidevin
2018
Stage 1 Chico Stage Race, Summer Moak
 Points classification Joe Martin Stage Race, Sara Bergen
Stage 2, Sara Bergen
Stage 4 Tour of the Gila, Emma White
 Sprints classification Tour of California, Emma White
 Young rider classification, Sara Poidevin
 Young rider classification Tour Cycliste Féminin International de l'Ardèche, Sara Poidevin
2019
Stage 2 Tour of the Gila, Heidi Franz
2020
Stage 1 Tour Down Under, Chloe Hosking
2023
Stage 1 Tour Down Under, Daria Pikulik
Aphrodite Cycling Race ITT, Antri Christoforou

National champions

2012
 Canada Road Race, Denise Ramsden
2013
 New Zealand Road Race, Courteney Lowe
 USA Road Race, Jade Wilcoxson
 Canada Time Trial, Joëlle Numainville
 Canada Road Race, Joëlle Numainville
2014
 Canada Time Trial, Leah Kirchmann
 Canada Road Race, Leah Kirchmann
 Canada Criterium, Leah Kirchmann
2015
 Canada Track (Team pursuit), Jasmin Glaesser
 Canada Track (Individual pursuit), Jasmin Glaesser
 Canada Track (Omnium), Jasmin Glaesser
 USA TTT
2017
 World Track (Team pursuit), Kelly Catlin
 Canada Road Race, Allison Beveridge
 Pan American Track (Individual pursuit), Kelly Catlin
 Pan American Track (Madison), Allison Beveridge
 Canada Track (Omnium), Allison Beveridge
 Canada Track (Team pursuit), Allison Beveridge
 Canada Track (Team pursuit), Katherine Maine
 Canada Track (Madison), Allison Beveridge
 Canada Track (Points race), Allison Beveridge
2018
 Canada U23 Time Trial, Sara Poidevin
 Canada Road Race, Katherine Maine
 Canada U23 Road Race, Katherine Maine
 Canada Criterium, Sara Bergen
 USA U23 Criterium, Emma White
 USA U23 Time Trial, Emma White
 USA U23 Road Race, Emma White
 Pan American Track (Team Pursuit), Kelly Catlin
 Pan American Track (Individual Pursuit), Kelly Catlin
2020
 Australia Criterium, Chloe Hosking
2021
 New Zealand Track (Scratch race), Olivia Ray
 USA U23 Cyclo-cross, Katie Clouse
2022
 New Zealand Road Race, Olivia Ray
 European Track (Individual Pursuit), Mieke Kröger
 Cyprus Time Trial, Antri Christoforou
 Cyprus Road Race, Antri Christoforou
 Netherlands Track (Madison), Marit Raaijmakers
 Netherlands Track (Points race), Marit Raaijmakers

Notes

References

External links
 

Cycling teams based in the United States
UCI Women's Teams
Women's sports teams in the United States
Cycling teams established in 2012
2012 establishments in the United States